"Live for the Night" is a single by American electronic dance music band Krewella. The song was released on July 2, 2013 for digital download and streaming. It is the fourth single from their debut album Get Wet, the first of which did not appear in one of their previous extended plays Play Hard or Play Harder. The song was written by band members Kris Trindl, Yasmine Yousaf and Jahan Yousaf, along with Nicholas Ditri and Daniel Boselovic, whilst production was handled by the electronic music trio Cash Cash, who also assisted in writing the song. It reached number one on Billboards Dance Club Songs chart in its October 19, 2013 issue.

Background
Krewella's debut album Get Wet was released on September 20, 2013. It spawned three singles prior to the release of "Live for the Night" these being "Killin' It", "Alive", and "Come & Get It".

Promotion
A set of remixes by Pegboard Nerds, Xilent, Dash Berlin, W&W, Danny Avila & Deniz Koyu was released on November 4, 2013.

Music video
The audio and lyric videos were released on the same day as the single's release, with the audio video being released via Proximity and the lyric video being released via KrewellaMusicVEVO, both on YouTube.
The music video was released on August 1, 2013. The music video features Krewella cutting off the power to a town and luring the people to a secret concert at the power plant where they are no longer slaves to the various electronic devices that distract them all day long.

Charts

Weekly charts

Year-end charts

References 

2013 singles
2013 songs
Columbia Records singles
Krewella songs